Kharkiv Oblast Football Federation (HOFF) is a football governing body in the region of Kharkiv Oblast, Ukraine. The federation is a member of the Regional Council of FFU and the collective member of the FFU itself.

Previous Champions

1947    FC Lokomotyv Kupyansk
1952    FC Lokomotyv Kupyansk (2)
1956    FC Start Chuhuiv
1957    FC Start Chuhuiv (2)
1958    FC Start Chuhuiv (3)
1959    FC Start Chuhuiv (4)
1960    FC Start Chuhuiv (5)
1961    FC Start Chuhuiv (6)
1962    FC Start Chuhuiv (7)
1963    FC Start Chuhuiv (8)
1964    FC Kolhospnyk Derhachi
1965    FC Start Chuhuiv (9)
1966    FC Lokomotyv Kupyansk (3)
1967    FC Mayak Kharkiv
1968    FC Mayak Kharkiv (2)
1969    FC Mayak Kharkiv (3)
1970    FC Mayak Kharkiv (4)
1971    FC Lokomotyv Panyutyne
1972    FC Mashynobudivnyk Zmiiv
1973    FC Metalurh Kupyansk
1974    FC Lokomotyv Lyubotyn
1975    FC Metalurh Kupyansk (2)
1976    FC Metalurh Kupyansk (3)
1977    FC Metalurh Kupyansk (4)
1978    FC Metalurh Kupyansk (5)
1979    FC Metalurh Kupyansk (6)
1980    FC Metalurh Kupyansk (7)
1981    FC Metalurh Kupyansk (8)
1982    FC Avanhard Lozova
1983    FC Avanhard Lozova (2)
1984    FC Tsementnyk Balakliya
1985    FC Tsementnyk Balakliya (2)
1986    FC Metalurh Kupyansk (9)
1987    FC Metalurh Kupyansk (10)
1988    FC Avanhard Lozova (3)
1989    FC Metalurh Kupyansk (11)
1990    FC Kolos Barvinkove
1991    FC Metalurh Kupyansk (12)
1992    FC Avanhard Lozova (4)
1993    FC Avanhard Merefa
1994    FC Avanhard Merefa (2)
1995    FC Avanhard Merefa (3)
1996    FC Avanhard Merefa (4)
1996-97 FC Enerhetyk Komsomolske
1998    FC Krystal Parkhomivka
1999    FC Krystal Parkhomivka (2)
2000    FC Krystal Parkhomivka (3)
2001    FC Lokomotyv Kupyansk (4)
2002    FC Hazovyk-KhGV Kharkiv
2003    FC Lokomotyv Kupyansk (5)
2004    FC Enerhetyk Solonytsivka
2005    FC Lokomotyv Kupyansk (6)
2006    FC Lokomotyv Kupyansk (7)
2007    FC Lokomotyv Kupyansk (8)
2008    FC Lokomotyv Kupyansk (9)
2009    FC Lokomotyv Kupyansk (10)
2010    FC Lokomotyv Kupyansk (11)
2011    FC Lokomotyv Kupyansk (12)
2012    FC Lokomotyv Kupyansk (13)
2013    FC Kolos Zachepylivka
2014    FC ETM Kharkiv
2015    FC ETM Kharkiv (2)
2016    FC Solli Plyus Kharkiv (3)
2017    FC Kolos Zachepylivka (2)
2018    FC Vovchansk
2019    FC Vovchansk (2)
2020    FC Univer-Dynamo Kharkiv
2021    FC Univer-Dynamo Kharkiv

Top winners
 13 - FC Lokomotyv Kupyansk
 12 - FC Metalurh Kupyansk
 9 - FC Start Chuhuiv
 4 - 3 clubs (Olympik, Avanhard L., Avanhard M.)
 3 - 2 clubs (Krystal, Solli Plyus (ETM))
 2 - 4 clubs (Tsementnyk, Kolos Z., Vovchansk, Univer-Dynamo)
 1 - 7 clubs (Kolhospnyk, Lokomotyv P., Mashynobudivnyk, Lokomotyv L., Kolos B., Enerhetyk K., Enerhetyk S.)

Professional clubs
 FC Dynamo Kharkiv, 1936-1937, 1939-1940
 FC Spartak Kharkiv, 1936-1939, 1941
 FC Torpedo Kharkiv (KhTZ, Traktor), 1936-1937, 1949, 1960-1969
 FC Selmash Kharkiv (Serp i Molot), 1936f-1940, 1946
 FC Lokomotyv Kharkiv, 1945-1955
 FC Metalist Kharkiv (Dzerzhinets, Avangard), 1946-1949, 1956-2016
 
 FC Zdorovie Kharkiv, 1946
 FC Olimpik Kharkiv (Mayak), 1972, 1982-1993
 FC Oskil Kupyansk, 1993-2002
 FC Arsenal Kharkiv, 1999-2009
 FC Helios Kharkiv (Helios-Kobra), 2003-2018
 FC Hazovyk-KhGV Kharkiv, 2003-2008
 FC Kharkiv, 2005-2010
 
 FC Lokomotyv Dvorichna, 2006-2007
 FC Metalist 1925 Kharkiv, 2017-
 FC Metalist Kharkiv (Metal), 2020-
 FC Vovchansk, 2021

See also
 FFU Council of Regions

References

External links
 Korzachenko, Yu. ''High level of amateurs (Високий рівень аматорів). Football Federation of Ukraine. 31 March 2010
 Kharkiv Oblast Football Federation
 Чемпионат Харьковской области. footballfacts.ru

Football in the regions of Ukraine
Football governing bodies in Ukraine
Sport in Kharkiv Oblast